Saurita tetraema is a moth in the subfamily Arctiinae. It was described by William Trowbridge Merrifield Forbes in 1939. It is found on Barro Colorado Island in the middle of the Panama Canal.

Note: The Global Lepidoptera Names Index and Lepidoptera and Some Other Life Forms both give the authority as "Fabes", but the original description, linked below, was by William T. M. Forbes.

References

External links
Original description: Forbes, William T. M. (1939). "The Lepidoptera of Barro Colorado Island, Panama". Bulletin of the Museum of Comparative Zoology at Harvard College. 85: 121.

Moths described in 1939
Saurita